Fairfield Beach may refer to:

Fairfield Beach, Connecticut
Fairfield Beach, Ohio